The Bellin Building is a historic office building constructed by the Bellin-Buchanan Building Co. on the corner of East Walnut St. and S. Washington St. in downtown Green Bay, Wisconsin. The building is a waypoint on the Packers Heritage Trail.
The Bellin Building was built in 1915, which is the first example of Chicago-style architecture using a terracotta face with ornate bevel features. Dr. Julius Bellin, a physician and surgeon, built it for use as offices for physicians, dentists, and other medical practices. Dr. Julius owned the building from 1915 to 1972. The building was purchased by Robert C. Safford in 1972 who owned it until 2006, after which the current investment group purchased it.

In 1924, the eighth and ninth floors were added as a penthouse. An unusual feature of the building is a manually-controlled elevator built in 1947, which is one of the few existing in the United States.

References

External links

Buildings and structures in Green Bay, Wisconsin
Packers Heritage Trail
Chicago school architecture in Wisconsin